Dmytro Serhiyovych Matsapura (born 10 March 2000) is a Ukrainian professional football goalkeeper who plays for Zorya Luhansk in the Ukrainian Premier League.

Career 
Matsapura is a product of the Metalist Kharkiv and Zorya Luhansk Youth Sportive Sportive Systems. He played for Zorya in the Ukrainian Premier League Reserves and in June 2020 Matsapura was promoted to the senior squad team. He made his debut in the Ukrainian Premier League for Zorya Luhansk on 5 July 2020, played in a match against FC Oleksandriya.

References

External links 
 
 

2000 births
Living people
Footballers from Kharkiv
Ukrainian footballers
FC Zorya Luhansk players
Ukrainian Premier League players
Association football goalkeepers